Thondamanatham is one of the 4 Firkas of Villianur taluk in Pondicherry (North) Revenue Sub-division of the Indian union territory of Puducherry.

Revenue villages
The following are the revenue villages under Thondamanatham Firka

 Koodapakkam
 Karasoor
 Olaivaikal
 Ousudu
 Ramanathaapuram
 Sedarapet
 Thondamanatham
 Thuthipet

See also
Kodathur firka
Mannadipet firka
Villianur firka

References

External links
 Department of Revenue and Disaster Management, Government of Puducherry

Geography of Puducherry
Puducherry district